Sir Peter Ball (died 1680) was an English landowner, barrister, and courtier who sat in the House of Commons in 1626, 1628/1629, and briefly in 1640. A royalist during the English Civil Wars, he was attorney general to Queen Henrietta Maria.

Ball was the son of Giles Ball of Mamhead, Devon. He was called to the bar from the Middle Temple in 1623 and became recorder of Exeter. He was elected as one of the two Members of Parliament for Tiverton in 1626 and was re-elected in 1628. He sat until 1629 when King Charles decided to rule without parliament for eleven years.  In 1636, he became an associate to the bench.

Ball’s father bought the Mamhead estate from the adventurer Sir Peter Carew (1514–1575). After inheriting the property, Ball began to build a new Mamhead House, replacing an older one. 

In April 1640, Ball was re-elected as one of the members for Tiverton in the Short Parliament, which sat from 13 April to 5 May of that year. He then became attorney-general to Queen Henrietta Maria and was Lent reader in 1641. He was knighted at Oxford on 7 October 1643 and was awarded the degree of Doctor of Civil Law by the University of Oxford on 19 February 1644.

Ball died in 1680 and was buried at Mamhead on 4 September 1680.

Ball married  Ann Cooke, daughter of Sir William Cooke, of Gloucestershire. They had seventeen children including William the astronomer and Peter the physician.

Arms

The canting coat of arms of the head of the Ball family of Mamhead, Devon, is blazoned: Argent a chevron gules between three fire balls proper.

External links
 Image of arms of Ball, per John Lambrick Vivian

References

Year of birth missing
1680 deaths
Members of the Middle Temple
17th-century English lawyers
English MPs 1626
English MPs 1628–1629
English MPs 1640 (April)